F. Amadee Bregy School is a historic school located in the Marconi Plaza neighborhood of Philadelphia, Pennsylvania. It is part of the School District of Philadelphia. The building was designed by Irwin T. Catharine and built in 1923–1924. It is a three-story, nine bay, brick building on a raised basement in the Colonial Revival-style. It features large stone arched surrounds, double stone cornice, projecting entrance pavilion, and a brick parapet.

It was added to the National Register of Historic Places in 1988.

Its feeder high school is South Philadelphia High School.

References

External links

School buildings on the National Register of Historic Places in Philadelphia
Colonial Revival architecture in Pennsylvania
School buildings completed in 1924
School District of Philadelphia
South Philadelphia
Public K–8 schools in Philadelphia
1924 establishments in Pennsylvania